The Southern African Institute of Mining and Metallurgy is a professional organisation for the mining and metallurgical industry in southern Africa.

References 

Mining organizations
Mining in South Africa